Yuranunt Pamornmontri (nicknamed Sam; born 2 January 1962) is a Thai actor and politician. He was born in Bangkok and started his career as an actor, later becoming a member of the House of Representatives from 2005 to 2006, during Thaksin Shinawatra's term as Prime Minister. He was elected as party-list MP again in the 2011 general election, substituting resigned Police Lieutenant General Chatt Kuldilok.

His father is Lieutenant general Prayoon Pamornmontri (พลโทประยูร ภมรมนตรี), one of the members of Khana Ratsadon, which successfully staged the Siamese revolution of 1932.

Political career
He entered politics in 2004 and moved to Thai Rak Thai party in the same year. After a landslide victory in 2005 general election, he became Member of Parliament and the deputy Government Spokesman but on 19 September 2006 a military junta overthrew Thaksin's government in a bloodless coup while he was abroad. The CNS-appointed constitutional tribunal dissolved the Thai Rak Thai party for electoral fraud, banning TRT's executives from politics for five years.

Yuranan moved to People's Power Party (PPP) and lost the 2007 general election, but leader of PPP Samak Sundaravej, became the Prime Minister. Then he became the adviser of Minister of Education Somchai Wongsawat who was the next Prime Minister.

In January 2009, he moved to Pheu Thai Party and was defeated in the 15th Bangkok gubernatorial election by Sukhumbhand Paribatra.

Acting career

Films and television

TV dramas

TV series

TV sitcom

Host
 Jet See Concert
 Tiang Wan Kan Ang
 Loon Kam Roke
 Ha Hai

Discography

Songs

Theater organizer
All television drama work as a theatrical producer YUTTAKARN NETWORK COMPANY LIMITED
 2001 ไฟน้ำค้าง
 2002 คนเริงเมือง
 2002 ต้นรักดอกงิ้ว
 2002 สะใภ้ไฮโซ

References

1963 births
Living people
Yuranunt Pamornmontri
Yuranunt Pamornmontri
Yuranunt Pamornmontri
Yuranunt Pamornmontri
Yuranunt Pamornmontri
Yuranunt Pamornmontri
Yuranunt Pamornmontri
Yuranunt Pamornmontri
Yuranunt Pamornmontri
Thai actor-politicians
Yuranunt Pamornmontri
Yuranunt Pamornmontri
Yuranunt Pamornmontri
Yuranunt Pamornmontri
Yuranunt Pamornmontri